Mizoribine (INN, trade name Bredinin) is an immunosuppressive drug. The compound was first observed in Tokyo, Japan, in 1971. First isolated from the fungus Penicillium brefeldianum.  Mizoribine (MZB) is an imidazole nucleoside that has been used in renal transplantation, and in steroid-resistant nephrotic syndrome, IgA nephropathy, lupus, as well as for adults with rheumatoid arthritis, lupus nephritis and other rheumatic diseases. MZB exerts its activity through selective inhibition of inosine monophosphate synthetase and guanosine monophosphate synthetase, resulting in the complete inhibition of guanine nucleotide synthesis without incorporation into nucleotides. It arrests DNA synthesis in the S phase of cellular division. Thus, MZB has less toxicity than azathioprine, another immunosuppressant used for some of the same diseases.

References 

Immunosuppressants

Mizoribine (MZB) is an imidazole nucleoside that has been used in renal transplantation, and in steroid-resistant nephrotic syndrome, IgA nephropathy, lupus, as well as for adults with rheumatoid arthritis, lupus nephritis and other rheumatic diseases. MZB exerts its activity through selective inhibition of inosine monophosphate synthetase and guanosine monophosphate synthetase, resulting in the complete inhibition of guanine nucleotide synthesis without incorporation into nucleotides. It arrests DNA synthesis in the S phase of cellular division. Thus, MZB has less toxicity than azathioprine, another immunosuppressant used for some of the same diseases.